Ajoy Nagar is a southern neighbourhood of Kolkata, India. Ajoy Nagar is surrounded by Santoshpur, Kalikapur, Mukundapur and Garia.

Transport
Jyotirindra Nath Nandi metro station and Satyajit Ray metro station, under construction on the Kavi Subhas-Biman Bandar route (Kolkata Metro Line 6), would serve Ajoy Nagar, Survey Park and Santoshpur areas lying close to the E.M. Bypass section of the city.

References 

South 24 Parganas district